German submarine U-323 was a Type VIIC/41 U-boat of Nazi Germany's Kriegsmarine during World War II.

She carried out no patrols and sank or damaged no ships.

The boat was scuttled on 5 May 1945 in northern Germany.

Design
Like all Type VIIC/41 U-boats, U-323 had a displacement of  when at the surface and  while submerged.

U-323 was fitted with five  torpedo tubes (four fitted at the bow and one at the stern), fourteen torpedoes, one  SK C/35 naval gun, (220 rounds), one  Flak M42 and two  C/30 anti-aircraft guns. Its complement was between forty-four and sixty.

Service history
The submarine was laid down on 12 March 1942 by the Flender Werke yard at Lübeck as yard number 323, launched on 12 January 1944 and commissioned on 2 March under the command of Kapitänleutnant Siegfried Pregel.

She served with the 4th U-boat Flotilla for training, from 2 March 1944 to 5 May 1945. The boat was scuttled on 5 May 1945 near Nordenham, (across the River Weser from Bremerhaven).

See also
 Battle of the Atlantic (1939-1945)

References

Bibliography

External links

German Type VIIC/41 submarines
U-boats commissioned in 1944
1944 ships
World War II submarines of Germany
Ships built in Lübeck
Operation Regenbogen (U-boat)